Oswald Constantine John Phipps, 4th Marquess of Normanby,  (29 July 1912 – 30 January 1994), styled Earl of Mulgrave until 1932, was a British peer and philanthropist for blind people.

Early life
The eldest son of Constantine Phipps, 3rd Marquess of Normanby and his wife Gertrude Stansfeld Foster, he was educated at Lambrook preparatory school, Eton College and Christ Church, Oxford. He inherited his father's titles in 1932 and joined the Green Howards as a Lieutenant in 1939. In 1940, Lord Normanby was captured at the Battle of Dunkirk and was a prisoner of war at Obermassfeldt in Thuringia until 1943. 

During his captivity, he persuaded his captors to allow him to teach braille to the blind prisoners, despite not knowing it himself. They constructed their alphabets with glass-headed pins and cardboard. He progressed from this to teach lessons in wider subjects. In recognition of his successful independent efforts, the head of St Dunstan's charity for blinded service personnel, Lord Fraser of Lonsdale, appointed him an honorary member of the charity's teaching staff. Later, when he was repatriated along with his blind students, he joined St Dunstan's council. He was also awarded a military MBE in recognition of his work in leading the POWs.

Politics
On his release, Lord Normanby was appointed an MBE and was Parliamentary Private Secretary to the Secretary of State for Dominion Affairs, Viscount Cranborne, from 1944 to 1945. He briefly served in the same post for the Lord President of the Council, Lord Woolton, in 1945. That year, Lord Normanby was also appointed a Lord-in-waiting, but the appointment was brief due to his crossing the floor, becoming the only Labour marquess (he later left the Labour Party also and became a crossbencher).

Family
On 10 February 1951, Lord Normanby married The Hon. Grania Maeve Rosaura Guinness (1920–2018), a daughter of The 1st Baron Moyne, an Anglo-Irish peer. 

They had seven children:

Lady Lepel Sophia (b. 1952)
Constantine Edmund Walter, styled Earl of Mulgrave, later 5th Marquess of Normanby (b. 1954)
Lady Evelyn Rose (1955–2018; married novelist James Buchan in 1986)
Lord Justin (b. 1958)
Lady Peronel Katharine (b. 1959)
Lady Henrietta Laura (b. 1962)
Lady Anne Elizabeth Grania (b. 1965)

Lady Normanby managed the Phipps family estate at Mulgrave as well as Bailiffscourt Estate in Sussex, inherited from her father. She also owned Warter Priory. Lady Normanby set up the Captain James Cook museum in Whitby and served as a magistrate on the local bench.

Later years

Lord Normanby was Chairman of King's College Hospital from 1948 (for which he was promoted to a CBE in 1974) until his death. As well as being a member of St Dunstan's council, he was also Chairman of the National Library for the Blind from 1946 until his death and its President from 1977 to 1988. In 1985, he was made a Knight of the Garter. He died in 1994 and his titles passed to his eldest son. Lord Normanby is buried in the churchyard of the 
Church of St Oswald, Lythe.

Notes

References
Burke's Peerage & Gentry, 107th edition

External links

1912 births
1994 deaths
Alumni of Christ Church, Oxford
British Army personnel of World War II
Commanders of the Order of the British Empire
Conservative Party (UK) Baronesses- and Lords-in-Waiting
Green Howards officers
Knights of the Garter
Knights of the Order of St John
Labour Party (UK) hereditary peers
Lord-Lieutenants of North Yorkshire
Lord-Lieutenants of the North Riding of Yorkshire
4
Ministers in the Churchill wartime government, 1940–1945
People educated at Eton College
Oswald
World War II prisoners of war held by Germany
Ministers in the Churchill caretaker government, 1945